Caloptilia stigmatella is a moth of the family Gracillariidae. It is known from the Holarctic Region, including all of Europe (except the Balkan Peninsula).

The forewings are red -brown, darkest towards costal blotch; a triangular white median costal blotch, usually mixed with brown -reddish, on costa marked with several blackish dots, apex emitting a slender outwardly oblique streak towards dorsum. Hindwings are grey. The larva is green-whitish; head yellowish, brown-marked.

Adults are on wing in late June and July, and again from September onwards.

The larvae feed on Myrica gale, Populus alba, Populus candicans, Populus canescens, Populus nigra, Populus tremula, Salix alba, Salix aurita, Salix babylonica, Salix cinerea, Salix dasyclados, Salix elaeagnos, Salix fragilis, Salix glaucosericea, Salix lanata, Salix magnifica, Salix myrsinifolia, Salix pentandra, Salix purpurea, Salix repens, Salix sitchensis, Salix spadicea, Salix x stipularis, Salix triandra, Salix udensis and Salix viminalis. They mine the leaves of their host plant. The mine starts with an unusually long lower-surface epidermal corridor that often follows the midrib for some distance, but finally turns towards the leaf margin, where a small blotch is made. The blotch is initially fully epidermal, but later the larva starts consuming parenchyma, silk is deposited and the blotch begins to develop into a somewhat contracted tentiform mine. Older larvae leave the mine and continue living freely under a leaf fold that has been bound together with silk, or in a leaf tip that has been turned into a cone. Pupation takes place in a shiny cocoon at the underside of the leaf.

References

External links
 
 
 lepiforum.de

stigmatella
Moths described in 1781
Moths of Europe
Moths of Asia
Moths of Japan
Taxa named by Johan Christian Fabricius